This is a list of state prisons in Washington housing adult inmates administered by the Washington State Department of Corrections (WADOC). It does not include federal prisons, county jails, or juvenile facilities located in Washington.

Current prisons
The Department currently operates 12 adult prisons (10 male institutions and 2 female institutions). The Department confines nearly 13,000 offenders in these facilities, with each varying in size and mission across the state.

Closed prisons
The following prisons are no longer in operation by the Department of Corrections.

 McNeil Island was opened in 1875 by the U.S. government as a federal penitentiary. WSDOC signed a lease in 1981 to use the island, which was officially deeded to the State of Washington in 1984.

References

External links
 Washington State Department of Corrections

Washington
Prisons